A hacienda ( or ;  or ) is an estate (or finca), similar to a Roman latifundium, in Spain and the former Spanish Empire. With origins in Andalusia, haciendas were variously plantations (perhaps including animals or orchards), mines or factories, with many haciendas combining these activities. The word is derived from Spanish hacer (to make, from Latin facere) and haciendo (making), referring to productive business enterprises.

The term hacienda is imprecise, but usually refers to landed estates of significant size, while smaller holdings were termed estancias or ranchos. All colonial haciendas were owned almost exclusively by Spaniards and criollos, or rarely by mestizo individuals. In Mexico, as of 1910, there were 8,245 haciendas in the country. In Argentina, the term estancia is used for large estates that in Mexico would be termed haciendas. In recent decades, the term has been used in the United States for an architectural style associated with the traditional estate manor houses.

The hacienda system of Argentina, Bolivia, Chile, Colombia, Guatemala, El Salvador, Mexico, New Granada, Philippines and Peru was an economic system of large land holdings. A similar system existed on a smaller scale in Puerto Rico and other territories. In Puerto Rico, haciendas were larger than estancias; ordinarily grew sugar cane, coffee, or cotton; and exported their crops abroad.

Origins and growth

Haciendas originated during the Reconquista of Andalusia in Spain. The sudden acquisition of conquered land allowed kings to grant extensive holdings to nobles, mercenaries, and religious military orders to reward their military service. Andalusian haciendas produced wine, grain, oils, and livestock, and were more purely agricultural than what was to follow in Spanish America.

During the Spanish colonization of the Americas, the hacienda model was exported to the New World, continuing the pattern of the Reconquista. As the Spanish established cities in conquered territories, the crown distributed smaller plots of land nearby, while in farther areas the conquistadores were allotted large land grants which became haciendas and estancias. Haciendas were developed as profit-making enterprises linked to regional or international markets. Estates were integrated into a market-based economy aimed at the Hispanic sector and cultivated crops such as sugar, wheat, fruits and vegetables and produced animal products such as meat, wool, leather, and tallow.

The system in Mexico is considered to have started when the Spanish crown granted to Hernán Cortés the title of Marquis of the Valley of Oaxaca in 1529, including the entire present state of Morelos, as well as vast encomienda labor grants. Although haciendas originated in grants to the elite, many ordinary Spaniards could also petition for land grants from the crown. New haciendas were formed in many places in the 17th and 18th centuries as most local economies moved from mining toward agriculture and husbandry.

Distribution of land happened in parallel to the distribution of indigenous people who entered servitude under the encomienda system. Although the hacienda was not directly linked to the encomienda, many Spanish holders of encomiendas lucratively combined the two by acquiring land or developing enterprises to employ that forced labor. As the crown moved to eliminate encomienda labor, Spaniards consolidated private landholdings and recruited labor on a permanent or casual basis. Eventually, the hacienda became secure private property, which survived the colonial period and into the 20th century.

Personnel

In Spanish America, the owner of an hacienda was called the hacendado or patrón. Most owners of large and profitable haciendas preferred to live in Spanish cities, often near the hacienda, but in Mexico, the richest owners lived in Mexico City, visiting their haciendas at intervals. Onsite management of the rural estates was by a paid administrator or manager, which was similar to the arrangement with the encomienda. Administrators were often hired for a fixed term of employment, receiving a salary and at times some share of the profits of the estate.  Some administrators also acquired landholdings themselves in the area of the estate they were managing.

The work force on haciendas varied, depending on the type of hacienda and where it was located.  In central Mexico near indigenous communities and growing crops to supply urban markets, there was often a small, permanent workforce resident on the hacienda.  Labor could be recruited from nearby indigenous communities on an as-needed basis, such as planting and harvest time. The permanent and temporary hacienda employees worked land that belonged to the patrón and under the supervision of local labor bosses. In some places small scale cultivators or campesinos worked small holdings belonging to the hacendado, and owed a portion of their crops to him.

Stock raising was central to ranching haciendas, the largest of which were in areas without dense indigenous populations, such as northern Mexico, but as indigenous populations declined in central areas, more land became available for grazing. Livestock were animals originally imported from Spain, including cattle, horses, sheep, and goats were part of the Columbian Exchange and produced significant ecological changes.  Sheep in particular had a devastating impact on the environment due to overgrazing. Most haciendas in Puerto Rico produced sugar, coffee, and tobacco, which were the crops for exporting.  Some estancias were larger than some haciendas, but generally this was the exception and not the norm.

Other meanings

List of haciendas

Hacienda Cocoyoc (Mexico)
Hacienda Buena Vista (Puerto Rico)
Hacienda Juriquilla (Mexico)
Hacienda Mercedita (Puerto Rico)
Hacienda Napoles (Colombia)
Hacienda San Antonio de Petrel (Chile)
Palacio San José (Argentina)
Hacienda San Jose Chactún (Mexico)
Hacienda Yorba (USA)
Sánchez Navarro latifundio (Mexico)

See also

 Cortijo
 Encomienda
 Estancia
 Fazenda
 Feudalism
 Mit'a, a form of tribute to the Inca government in the form of labor, abused by the Spanish Viceroyalty of Peru
 Plantation
 Ranch
 Ranchos of California
 Repartimiento, a colonial forced labor system imposed upon the indigenous population of Spanish America
 Roman villa
 Latifundium
 "My Adobe Hacienda"

Notes

References

Further reading

General

 Mörner, Magnus. "The Spanish American Hacienda: A Survey of Recent Research and Debate," Hispanic American Historical Review (1973), 53#2, pp. 183–216 in JSTOR
Van Young, Eric, "Mexican Rural History Since Chevalier: The Historiography of the Colonial Hacienda," Latin American Research Review, 18 (3) 1983; 5-61. 
Villalobos, Sergio; Silva, Osvaldo; Silva, Fernando; Estelle, Patricio (1974). Historia De Chile (14th ed.). Editorial Universitaria. .

Haciendas in Mexico

 Bartlett, Paul Alexander. The Haciendas of Mexico: An Artist's Record. Niwot, CO: University Press of Colorado, 1990 in Project Gutenberg
 Bauer, Arnold. "Modernizing landlords and constructive peasants: In the Mexican countryside", Mexican Studies / Estudios Mexicanos (Winter 1998), 14#1, pp. 191–212.
D. A. Brading, Haciendas and Ranchos in the Mexican Bajío. Cambridge and New York: Cambridge University Press, 1978.
Chevalier, François. Land and Society in Colonial Mexico. Berkeley: University of California Press, 1963.
. "The Hacienda in New Spain." In Leslie Bethell (ed.), The Cambridge History of Latin America, vol. 4, Cambridge and New York: Cambridge University Press, 1984.
Florescano, Enrique. Precios de maíz y crisis agrícolas en México, 1708 – 1810. Mexico City: Colegio de México, 1969.
Gibson, Charles. The Aztecs Under Spanish Rule. Stanford: Stanford University Press, 1964.
Harris, Charles H. A Mexican Family Empire: The Latifundio of the Sánchez Navarros, 1765 – 1867. Austin: University of Texas Press, 1975, .
Konrad, Herman W. A Jesuit Hacienda in Colonial Mexico: Santa Lucía, 1576–1767. Stanford: Stanford University Press, 1980.
Lockhart, James. "Encomienda and Hacienda: The Evolution of the Great Estate in the Spanish Indies," Hispanic American Historical Review, 1969, 59: 411–29,
Miller, Simon. Landlords and Haciendas in Modernizing Mexico. Amsterdam: CEDLA, 1995.
Morin, Claude. Michoacán en la Nueva España del Siglo XVIII: Crecimiento y dissigualidad en una economía colonial. Mexico City: Fondo de Cultura Económica, 1979.
Schryer, Frans J. The Rancheros of Pisaflores. Toronto: University of Toronto Press, 1978.
Taylor, William B. Landlord and Peasant in Colonial Oaxaca. Stanford: Stanford University Press, 1972.
Tayor, William B. "Landed Society in New Spain: A View from the South," Hispanic American Historical Review (1974), 54#3, pp. 387–413 in JSTOR
Tutino, John. From Insurrection to Revolution in Mexico. Princeton: Princeton University Press, 1986.
Van Young, Eric. Hacienda and Market in Eighteenth-Century Mexico. Berkeley: University of California Press, 1981.
Wasserman, Mark. Capitalists, Caciques, and Revolution. Chapel Hill: University of North Carolina Press, 1984.
Wells, Allen. Yucatán's Gilded Age. Albuquerque: University of New Mexico Press, 1985.

Haciendas in Puerto Rico
 Balletto, Barbara Insight Guide Puerto Rico
 De Wagenheim, Olga J. Puerto Rico: An Interpretive History from Precolumbia Times to 1900
 Figueroa, Luis A. Sugar, Slavery and Freedom in Nineteenth Century Puerto Rico
 Scarano, Francisco A. Sugar and Slavery in Puerto Rico: The Plantation Economy of Ponce, 1800–1850
 Schmidt-Nowara, Christopher Empire and Antislavery: Spain, Cuba and Puerto Rico, 1833–1874
 Soler, Luis M. D. Historia de la esclavitud negra en Puerto Rico

South America
Lyons, Barry J. Remembering the Hacienda: Religion, Authority and Social Change in Highland Ecuador (2006)

Salazar, Gabriel; Pinto, Julio (2002). Historia contemporánea de Chile III. La economía: mercados empresarios y trabajadores. LOM Ediciones. .

External links

historic Fazendas in Brazil

Encomenderos
Spanish colonization of the Americas
Unfree labour
Debt bondage
History of Colombia
Culture in Rio Grande do Sul
Economic history of Mexico
History of agriculture in Brazil
Country estates
Plantations